Plants is a peer-reviewed open-access scientific journal that covers various areas of plant biology, including cellular biology, molecular biology, genetics, and ecology. It is published by MDPI and was established in 2011. The editor-in-chief is Clive Dilantha Fernando (University of Manitoba).

The journal publishes original research articles, review articles, and short communications.

Abstracting and indexing
The journal is abstracted and indexed in:

According to the Journal Citation Reports, the journal has a 2021 impact factor of 4.658.

References

External link 

Botany journals
English-language journals
MDPI academic journals
Publications established in 2011
Continuous journals
Creative Commons Attribution-licensed journals